Shapur IV ( Šāhpuhr), was king of Sasanian Armenia from 415 to 420, who briefly ruled the Sasanian Empire in 420.

Biography 
Shapur IV was the son of Yazdegerd I and Shushandukht, and had two brothers named Bahram V and Narse. At the death of the Arsacid Armenian king Khosrov IV, Yazdegerd I decided to give the royal crown of Armenia to his eldest son Shapur IV, instead of giving it to Khosrov's nephew, Artaxias IV. During Shapur's reign in Armenia, he concentrated on reconciliation and established friendly relations with the nobles. He made every effort to convert the Christian Armenians to Zoroastrianism, but was largely unsuccessful.

In 420, Yazdegerd I was murdered by the Sasanian nobles at Hyrcania, which made Shapur quickly leave Armenia and arrive at Ctesiphon to claim the Sasanian throne. However, he only managed to reign during a short time, until he was murdered by the nobles and the clergy, who sought to expel all the sons of Yazdegerd I. After the murder of Shapur, the nobles elected another Sasanian prince, Khosrau, the son of Bahram IV, as king of the Sasanian Empire.

Notes

References

Sources 

420 deaths
5th-century Sasanian monarchs
Year of birth unknown
Murdered Persian monarchs
Sasanian governors of Armenia
5th-century murdered monarchs